Dipropus is a genus of click beetles in the family Elateridae. There are around 150 described species in Dipropus, found in North, Central, and South America.

Species
These species, among others, belong to the genus Dipropus:

 Dipropus alopex (Fabricius, 1801)
 Dipropus amarakaeri Johnson, 2018
 Dipropus anceps (Candèze, 1859)
 Dipropus angustatus (Champion, 1895)
 Dipropus asper (LeConte, 1878)
 Dipropus atricornis (Champion, 1895)
 Dipropus badius (Candèze, 1859)
 Dipropus bifasciatus (Champion, 1895)
 Dipropus brasilianus (Germar, 1824)
 Dipropus brunneus (Candèze, 1859)
 Dipropus chloropterus (Erichson, 1848)
 Dipropus deletus (Candèze, 1859)
 Dipropus erythroderus (Candèze, 1878)
 Dipropus ferreus (LeConte, 1853)
 Dipropus inornatus (Candèze, 1859)
 Dipropus laticollis (Eschscholtz, 1829)
 Dipropus latus (Candèze, 1859)
 Dipropus losamigos Johnson, 2018
 Dipropus melas (Champion, 1895)
 Dipropus metallicus (Champion, 1895)
 Dipropus nigrita (Candèze, 1859)
 Dipropus pericu Johnson, 2016
 Dipropus porosus (Erichson, 1848)
 Dipropus puberulus (Boheman, 1858)
 Dipropus punctatus (Candèze, 1859)
 Dipropus puncticollis (Fabricius, 1801)
 Dipropus reinae Johnson 2016
 Dipropus rufulus (Candèze, 1859)
 Dipropus schwarzi (Becker, 1961)
 Dipropus simplex (LeConte, 1853)
 Dipropus soleatus (Say, 1834)
 Dipropus sonora Johnson 2016
 Dipropus subsericeus (Candèze, 1859)
 Dipropus subsericeus (Candèze, 1859)
 Dipropus sus (Candèze, 1859)
 Dipropus tequesta Johnson 2017
 Dipropus warneri Johnson 2016
 Dipropus yaqui Johnson 2016

References

Elateridae
Elateridae genera
Taxa named by Ernst Friedrich Germar